Vučetić is a Slavic Serbian and Croatian surname derived from the masculine given name Vučeta. It may refer to:

Juan Vucetich (1858 – 1925) was a Croatian-Argentine anthropologist and police official who pioneered the use of dactyloscopy (fingerprint identification)
Marko Vučetić (born 1986), Serbian football player
Vasilije Vučetić (born 1995), Serbian basketball player
Jelena Vučetić (born 1993), Montenegrin Serb basketball player

See also
Vucetich

Serbian surnames
Croatian surnames